Janet Kathleen Morrison is a Canadian academic administrator serving as the 8th president and vice chancellor of Sheridan College. She was previously the vice provost of students at York University.

Career 
Morrison completed a Ph.D. in higher education at the Bowling Green State University in August 1997. Her dissertation was titled, Correlates and Predictors of Safer Sexual Behavior Among Canadian Undergraduate University Students. C. Carney Strange was her doctoral advisor.

Morrison worked in student affairs and taught at the University of Guelph, Bowling Green State University, Medical College of Ohio, and George Brown College. She joined York University where she worked for 17 years in several roles before being promoted to vice provost of students. Morrison joined Sheridan College in 2016 as the provost and vice president. On June 11, 2018, she became its 8th president and vice chancellor.

Morrison has two children.

References 

Living people
Year of birth missing (living people)
Canadian university and college chief executives
Bowling Green State University alumni
Academic staff of the University of Guelph
University of Toledo faculty
Academic staff of George Brown College
Academic staff of York University
Canadian women academics
21st-century Canadian women
Women heads of universities and colleges
Place of birth missing (living people)